Braxton County is a county in the central part of the U.S. state of West Virginia. As of the 2020 census, the population was 12,447. The county seat is Sutton. The county was formed in 1836 from parts of Lewis, Kanawha, and Nicholas counties and named for Carter Braxton, a Virginia statesman and signer of the Declaration of Independence.

In 2010, the center of population of West Virginia was in northern Braxton County.

Important salt works were located at Bulltown and here, in 1772, Captain Bull and his family and friendly Delaware Indians were massacred by frontiersmen. Jesse Hughes helped Jeremiah Carpenter track and kill the Indians responsible for the Carpenter massacre. Jeremiah was a notable fiddle player who wrote a song Shelvin’ Rock about the experience of escaping to rock shelter.

Geography

In 1863, West Virginia's counties were divided into civil townships, with the intention of encouraging local government.  This proved impractical in the heavily rural state, and in 1872 the townships were converted into magisterial districts.  Braxton County was originally divided into four townships: Clay, Franklin, Lincoln, and Washington, which became magisterial districts in 1872.  All four districts were renamed in 1873: Clay District became Kanawha, Franklin became Holly, Lincoln became Otter, and Washington became Birch.  Two years later, Salt Lick District was formed from part of Kanawha.  The two districts were reconsolidated between 1910 and 1920, when the territory of Kanawha District was added to Salt Lick; otherwise they remained stable for the next sixty years.  Between 1980 and 1990, the county was reorganized into four new magisterial districts: Northern, Southern, Eastern, and Western.

Major highways
  Interstate 79
  U.S. Highway 19
  West Virginia Route 4
  West Virginia Route 5
  West Virginia Route 15

Adjacent counties
 Lewis County (northeast)
 Webster County (southeast)
 Nicholas County (south)
 Clay County (southwest)
 Calhoun County (west)
 Gilmer County (northwest)

Demographics

2000 census
As of the census of 2000, there were 14,702 people, 5,771 households, and 4,097 families living in the county.  The population density was 29 people per square mile (11/km2).  There were 7,374 housing units at an average density of 14 per square mile (6/km2).  The racial makeup of the county was 98.02% White, 0.69% Black or African American, 0.35% Native American, 0.11% Asian, 0.05% Pacific Islander, 0.08% from other races, and 0.71% from two or more races.  0.44% of the population were Hispanic or Latino of any race.

There were 5,771 households, out of which 30.30% had children under the age of 18 living with them, 57.30% were married couples living together, 9.20% had a female householder with no husband present, and 29.00% were non-families. 25.20% of all households were made up of individuals, and 12.40% had someone living alone who was 65 years of age or older.  The average household size was 2.46 and the average family size was 2.92.

In the county, the population was spread out, with 22.80% under the age of 18, 7.50% from 18 to 24, 28.10% from 25 to 44, 25.80% from 45 to 64, and 15.80% who were 65 years of age or older.  The median age was 40 years. For every 100 females there were 102.60 males.  For every 100 females age 18 and over, there were 103.00 males.

The median income for a household in the county was $24,412, and the median income for a family was $29,133. Males had a median income of $27,560 versus $17,778 for females. The per capita income for the county was $13,349.  About 17.90% of families and 22.00% of the population were below the poverty line, including 27.90% of those under age 18 and 13.70% of those age 65 or over.

2010 census
As of the 2010 United States census, there were 14,523 people, 6,000 households, and 4,043 families living in the county. The racial makeup of the county was 98.2% white, 0.4% black or African American, 0.3% American Indian, 0.2% Asian, 0.0% from other races, and 0.9% from two or more races. Those of Hispanic or Latino origin made up 0.5% of the population. In terms of ancestry, 19.7% were German, 15.0% were Irish, 11.7% were English, and 8.0% were American.

Of the 6,000 households, 28.0% had children under the age of 18 living with them, 52.8% were married couples living together, 9.5% had a female householder with no husband present, 32.6% were non-families, and 27.9% of all households were made up of individuals. The average household size was 2.36 and the average family size was 2.86. The median age was 43.8 years.

The median income for a household in the county was $32,158 and the median income for a family was $40,421. Males had a median income of $42,355 versus $22,557 for females. The per capita income for the county was $17,469. About 17.0% of families and 21.0% of the population were below the poverty line, including 30.4% of those under age 18 and 13.0% of those age 65 or over.

Politics
Braxton County, although initially opposed to secession during the first session of the Virginia Secession Convention, later became supportive. Consequently, up until the decline of coal mining unionization, and growing opposition to socially controversial issues, Braxton County was overwhelmingly Democratic. Like all of West Virginia, it has seen an extremely rapid shift to the Republicans over the past five elections.

Communities

Towns
 Burnsville
 Flatwoods
 Gassaway
 Sutton (county seat)

Magisterial districts
 Eastern
 Northern
 Southern
 Western

Unincorporated communities

 Bonnie
 Braxton
 Canfield
 Caress
 Centralia
 Clem
 Copen
 Corley
 Cutlips
 Dingy
 Duck
 Elmira
 Exchange
 Falls Mill
 Frametown
 Gem
 Gip
 Glendon
 Heaters
 Herold
 Little Birch
 Little Otter
 Napier
 Newville
 Riffle
 Rosedale
 Servia
 Strange Creek
 Tague
 Tesla
 Wilsie

See also
 Elk River Wildlife Management Area
 National Register of Historic Places listings in Braxton County, West Virginia

References

 
1836 establishments in Virginia
Populated places established in 1836
Counties of Appalachia